The 2002–03 season of the Norwegian Premier League, the highest bandy league for men in Norway.

16 games were played, with 2 points given for wins and 1 for draws. Mjøndalen won the league. No team was relegated; as the bottom team survived a playoff round. Instead the league was expanded with one extra team from the next season.

League table

References
Table

Seasons in Norwegian bandy
2002 in bandy
2003 in bandy
Band
Band